William Mattus Vega (born April 17, 1964 in Barva, Heredia) is a former football referee from Costa Rica, best known for supervising two matches during the 2002 FIFA World Cup held in Japan and South Korea. As of 2022, Mattus is the last Costa Rican to officiate a match at a FIFA World Cup, as fellow countrymen have performed as assistant referees only.

References
 William Mattus – referee profile at WorldFootball.net
 William Mattus – referee profile at Weltfussball.de 

1964 births
Living people
People from Heredia Province
Costa Rican football referees
FIFA World Cup referees
Copa América referees
2002 FIFA World Cup referees